Lee Allen may refer to:
Lee Allen (wrestler) (1934–2012), wrestler and coach
Lee Allen (baseball) (1915–1969), baseball historian
Lee Allen (musician) (1927–1994), saxophone player
Lee Allen (artist) (1910–2006), American artist and ocularist
Lee Allen (motorcycle racer), American motorcycle racer, see 1964 Grand Prix motorcycle racing season
R. Lee Allen (born 1927), American politician